Zeiraphera isertana is a moth of the family Tortricidae. It is found in China (Liaoning, Gansu, Qinghai), Russia, Europe and the Near East.

The wingspan is 13–18 mm. This species is very variable in its colour pattern. The dorsal edge of the forewings often has lighter spots.
The moth flies from July to August in western Europe.

The larvae feed on the leaves of Quercus, Pyrus and Ulmus species.

References

External links
 waarneming.nl .
 Lepidoptera of Belgium
 Zeiraphera isertana at UK Moths

Moths described in 1794
Eucosmini
Tortricidae of Europe